Robert Joseph MacDonald (born April 27, 1965) is an American former professional baseball pitcher. He played in Major League Baseball (MLB) for the Toronto Blue Jays, Detroit Tigers, New York Yankees, and New York Mets. MacDonald also played in Nippon Professional Baseball (NPB) for the Hanshin Tigers.

Career
MacDonald went to college at Rutgers University, and was drafted by the Blue Jays in the 19th round of the 1987 amateur draft. In 1997, he played in Japan for the Hanshin Tigers.

MacDonald manages a semi-pro slow pitch softball team in Clearwater, Florida.

External links

1965 births
Living people
American expatriate baseball players in Canada
American expatriate baseball players in Japan
Baseball players from New Jersey
Birmingham Barons players
Calgary Cannons players
Columbus Clippers players
Detroit Tigers players
Hanshin Tigers players
Knoxville Blue Jays players
Major League Baseball pitchers
Medicine Hat Blue Jays players
Myrtle Beach Blue Jays players
Nashville Sounds players
New York Mets players
New York Yankees players
Nippon Professional Baseball pitchers
Norfolk Tides players
Rutgers Scarlet Knights baseball players
Sportspeople from East Orange, New Jersey
St. Catharines Blue Jays players
Syracuse Chiefs players
Toronto Blue Jays players